Both of the New Hampshire incumbents were re-elected.

See also 
 List of United States representatives from New Hampshire
 1972 United States House of Representatives elections

1972
New Hampshire
1972 New Hampshire elections